The IWC Women's Championship is a professional wrestling women's championship in the wrestling promotion International Wrestling Cartel.  The title was first awarded on December 10, 2016, when Britt Baker defeated Marti Belle, April Sera, and Sonya Strong in a four-way elimination match by last eliminating Sera.

As of April 24, 2022, there have been ten reigns among seven wrestlers.  The inaugural champion was Britt Baker.  Katie Arquette has the most reigns at three.  Ray Lyn has the longest singular reign at 456 days.  Madison Rayne has the shortest singular reign at 28 days.

The current champion is Ashley D'Amboise.  She defeated Ella Shae at Reloaded 8.0 on January 22, 2022.

Title history

Names

Reigns

|}

Reigns by combined length
Key

References

Women's
IWC Women's